Alex Sandro Lobo da Silva (born 26 January 1991) is a Brazilian professional footballer who plays as a left-back, left-midfielder or centre-back for  club Juventus and the Brazil national team.

At club level, Alex Sandro began his career with Atletico Paranaense, and later also played for Santos on loan. In 2011, he joined Porto for €9.6 million, alongside teammate and countryman Danilo, who plays as a right back. He joined Juventus in 2015, winning the domestic double in his first three seasons, followed by two more consecutive league titles over the following two years.

At international level, Alex Sandro represents Brazil, for which he has gained 30 caps. At youth level, he also represented the Brazil under-20 team, winning both the South American Youth Championship and the FIFA U-20 World Cup in 2011, He was later also part of the Brazil squad that won the 2019 Copa América.

Club career

Atletico Paranaense
After winning an impressive amount of honours with the Atletico Paranaense youth setup and a very good performance in the Copa Parana with the U23 side, Alex Sandro earned his first call up to the senior side in October 2008. He played one game in the Brasileiro, taking on Internacional on 18 October.

In 2009, Alex Sandro played a role in Atletico's championship run in the Campeonato Paranaense, playing in eight matches. He scored his first goal on 25 January against Rio Branco, passing the ball to himself around the keeper. As of October 2009, he has played in nine Brasileiro matches, playing a total of 269 minutes.

Santos
Alex Sandro was signed by Santos in 2010 on a two-year loan deal. Atletico Paranaense sold him to the investors, using Uruguayan club Deportivo Maldonado as a proxy to hold the registration rights. According to Atletico Paranaense's 2010 financial report, the club received R$1,114,000 from Deportivo Maldonado for transactions of unnamed players.

Porto

On 23 July 2011, Portuguese Primeira Liga club Porto signed Alex Sandro for €9.6 million from the proxy club Deportivo Maldonado. He signed a five-year contract with a release clause of €50 million.

Juventus

2015–16 
On 20 August 2015, Alex Sandro joined Italian Serie A champions Juventus for €26 million on a five-year contract. He made his club debut on 12 September 2015 in a 1–1 home draw against Chievo in Serie A. Defending champions Juventus endured a difficult start to the season, and were in the bottom half of the table by late October. The club mounted a comeback that started with a last-gasp Turin derby win on 31 October, with the Brazilian left-back playing a key role in that upturn.

On 21 November 2015, Sandro assisted Paulo Dybala with a cross, helping Juventus beat rival side AC Milan 1–0 in Serie A. Four days later, on 25 November, he assisted another winning goal, for Mario Mandžukić, in a 1–0 home win over Manchester City in the UEFA Champions League to secure the club a spot in the round of 16 of the competition. On 17 January 2016, Alex Sandro scored his first Juventus goal – and his first in Serie A – from the top of the 18-yard box in the 42nd minute of a 4–0 away win over Udinese.

On 17 February, it was confirmed Alex Sandro would be sidelined for ten days after he picked up an injury to his rectus femoris muscle in his left thigh during training at the Juventus Center the day before, forcing him to miss out on the first leg of the round of 16 of the Champions League on 23 February against Bayern Munich. He returned for the second leg in Munich, where he could not prevent his team's elimination despite putting on a strong individual performance.

The Brazilian completed his first season in Turin winning a Serie A–Coppa Italia double. He came on as a substitute for Patrice Evra in the Coppa Italia final against Milan at the Stadio Olimpico in Rome, which was decided by an Álvaro Morata lone goal in extra time.

2016–17 
Despite scoring an own goal in a 3–1 away defeat to Genoa, Alex Sandro carried his form of the previous season into the new one. A series of impressive performances saw him displace incumbent Patrice Evra from the starting left back role. The Frenchman eventually moved to Marseille in January 2017.

Alex Sandro completed the season with 43 appearances across competitions, 11 more than the previous year. That made him one of the most frequently used players by coach Massimiliano Allegri. From a statistical standpoint, the Brazilian also further improved his goalscoring output, netting three times in the league as Juventus completed a third successive league and cup double.

The one trophy that evaded Alex Sandro was the UEFA Champions League, which saw his side lose 4–1 in the final to holders Real Madrid at the Millennium Stadium in Cardiff. Alex Sandro played a key role in Mario Mandžukić's temporary equaliser in the first half, supplying the cross that was chested down to the Croatian by Gonzalo Higuaín. In the second half, however, Alex Sandro's and his teammates' performances were less convincing, and one of Alex Sandro's mistakes led to a goal from his former Brazil Under-20 and Porto colleague Casemiro.

Prior to the final he had played a vital role in the Bianconeri's run, especially in the quarter-finals against Barcelona, where excellent defensive performances helped to neutralise the attacking threat of Lionel Messi, and enabled Juventus to keep clean sheets across both legs of the tie.

2017–18 
In his third season with Juventus, Alex Sandro made 39 appearances for Juventus in all competitions, scoring four goals, all of which came in Serie A, from 26 league appearances; he finished the 2017–18 season by winning a third consecutive domestic double with the club.

2018–19 
On 23 October 2018, Alex Sandro made his 50th UEFA Champions League appearance (excluding qualifying rounds) in a 1–0 away win over Manchester United. He made his 100th Serie A appearance with Juventus on 30 March 2019, in a 1–0 home win over Empoli. In Juventus's following league match on 2 April, a 2–0 away win over Cagliari, he made his 150th appearance for the club. On 20 April, he scored the temporary equaliser as Juventus came from behind to defeat rivals Fiorentina 2–1 at home and win the Serie A title.

2019–20 

On 24 August 2019, on the opening matchday of the 2019–20 Serie A season, Alex Sandro assisted Giorgio Chiellini's goal in a 1–0 away win against Parma. On 18 December, he provided two assists, one for Paulo Dybala and another for Cristiano Ronaldo, in a 2–1 away win against Sampdoria.

International career

Youth
Alex Sandro is a part of the golden Atlético Paranaense youth setup, which has produced a great amount of defenders in very little time, with Raul, Manoel, Ronaldo Alves, Carlão and Bruno Costa all making themselves known in 2009. After being a part of the Brazil under-18 setup, Alex Sandro was called up to the under-20 side in August 2009, alongside teammates Raul, Renan Foguinho and Gabriel Pimba. He made his debut in a friendly match at 18 years of age.

He was a member of the teams that won the 2011 South American Youth Championship in Peru, as well as the 2011 FIFA U-20 World Cup in Colombia, also featuring in the final of the tournament against Portugal, which Brazil won 3–2 in extra-time.

Senior
Alex Sandro made his senior international debut on 10 November 2011 in a 2–0 away win over Gabon. He scored his first international goal on 12 October 2018, in a 2–0 friendly away win over Saudi Arabia.

In May 2019, Sandro was included in Brazil's 23-man squad for the 2019 Copa América on home soil by manager Tite. In Brazil's final group match on 22 June, a 5–0 win against Peru, Sandro made a substitute appearance, coming on for Filipe Luís. In the quarter-final match against Paraguay on 27 June, he once again made a substitute appearance, replacing the injured Filipe Luís at half-time; following a 0–0 draw, Brazil advanced to the semi-finals 4–3 on penalties. Sandro started in the 2019 Copa América Final against Peru on 7 July, at the Maracanã Stadium; the match ended in a 3–1 victory to Brazil.

On 17 June 2021, he scored the opening goal in a 4–0 win over Peru in Brazil's second group match of the 2021 Copa América, which took place on home soil.

On 7 November 2022, Alex Sandro was named in the squad for the 2022 FIFA World Cup.

Style of play

Regarded as one of the best left-backs in the world, Alex Sandro is a quick, energetic and offensive minded defender, who is also a strong tackler and a good reader of the game, courtesy of his speed and anticipation. He is capable of playing anywhere along the left flank; although mainly a full-back, he has also been used as a wing-back and as a wide midfielder. He has also occasionally been deployed in a more advanced position, as an outside forward or offensive winger, and even as a left-sided centre-back in a three–man back-line. He has been described as a player who is a "powerful runner, can beat opponents one-on-one and is an excellent crosser of the ball". His playing position, athleticism, and playing style have drawn comparisons with compatriot and 2002 FIFA World Cup-winner Roberto Carlos.

Career statistics

Club

International

Scores and results list Brazil's goal tally first, score column indicates score after each Alex Sandro goal.

Honours
Santos
Copa do Brasil: 2010
Copa Libertadores: 2011
Campeonato Paulista: 2010, 2011

Porto
Primeira Liga: 2011–12, 2012–13
Supertaça Cândido de Oliveira: 2013

Juventus
Serie A: 2015–16, 2016–17, 2017–18, 2018–19, 2019–20
Coppa Italia: 2015–16, 2016–17, 2017–18, 2020–21; runner-up: 2019–20, 2021–22
Supercoppa Italiana: 2018
UEFA Champions League runner-up: 2016–17

Brazil U20
FIFA U-20 World Cup: 2011
South American U-20 Championship: 2011

Brazil
Copa América: 2019
 Superclásico de las Américas: 2018

Individual
O Jogo Team of the Year: 2012, 2013
Serie A Team of the Year: 2016–17, 2017–18
FIFA FIFPro World11 nominee 2019 (20th defender)

References

External links

Profile at the Juventus F.C. website

1991 births
Living people
People from Catanduva
Footballers from São Paulo (state)
Brazilian footballers
Association football defenders
Club Athletico Paranaense players
Santos FC players
FC Porto players
Juventus F.C. players
Campeonato Brasileiro Série A players
Primeira Liga players
Serie A players
Brazil youth international footballers
Brazil under-20 international footballers
Olympic footballers of Brazil
Brazil international footballers
Footballers at the 2012 Summer Olympics
Olympic silver medalists for Brazil
Olympic medalists in football
Medalists at the 2012 Summer Olympics
2019 Copa América players
2021 Copa América players
2022 FIFA World Cup players
Copa América-winning players
Brazilian expatriate footballers
Brazilian expatriate sportspeople in Portugal
Brazilian expatriate sportspeople in Italy
Expatriate footballers in Portugal
Expatriate footballers in Italy